Bodd may refer to:

 Leon Bodd (1924–2014), Norwegian lawyer and politician
 Lisbeth Bodd (1958–2014), Norwegian performance artist

See also